Morbakka fenneri, also known as the Moreton Bay stinger or the fire jelly, is a small box jellyfish found in the waters of Australia and Thailand. It has a transparent bell shape with four mauve colored tentacles that are each 50cm long. It is hard to capture this jellyfish to study it due to its small size, fragility, toxicity, and similarity to other species of box jellyfish. 

The sting from this species results in symptoms similar to Irukandji syndrome. The wound is typically 10mm wide and is followed by an immediate burning sensation. If left untreated, it can become necrose, pruritic, and vesicule.

References

Animals described in 2008
Cnidarians of the Pacific Ocean
Carukiidae